Have a Heart Compassion Care is a cannabis dispensary chain in Washington state.

History 
Have a Heart Compassion Care was founded by Ryan Kunkel in 2011.

There are currently six Have a Heart dispensaries in the state of Washington.

On August 24, 2018, Have a Heart and the United Food and Commercial Workers International Union Local 21 signed Washington state's first collective bargaining agreement between an adult-use cannabis dispensary and a union.

On March 16, 2020 Harvest Health and Recreation announced its acquisition of Have a Heart for 85.8 million dollars.

References

Cannabis companies of the United States
Companies based in Seattle
2011 establishments in Washington (state)
American companies established in 2011
Privately held companies based in Washington (state)